Fernando Harry Álvez Mosquera (born September 4, 1959 in Montevideo) is a Uruguayan former footballer who played as a goalkeeper for the Uruguay national team and several clubs in Uruguay, Paraguay, Colombia, Brazil and Argentina.

Álvez obtained 40 caps for the Uruguay national team. Having made his debut on July 18, 1980 in a friendly against Peru (0-0), Álvez was a member of the 1986 and 1990 FIFA World Cup teams.

References

  Profile

Uruguayan footballers
Association football goalkeepers
Uruguay under-20 international footballers
Uruguay international footballers
1986 FIFA World Cup players
1990 FIFA World Cup players
1991 Copa América players
1995 Copa América players
Footballers from Montevideo
Uruguayan Primera División players
Categoría Primera A players
Defensor Sporting players
Peñarol players
Club Atlético River Plate (Montevideo) players
Club Libertad footballers
San Lorenzo de Almagro footballers
Deportivo Mandiyú footballers
Uruguayan expatriate footballers
Expatriate footballers in Argentina
Expatriate footballers in Paraguay
Expatriate footballers in Colombia
Expatriate footballers in Brazil
Uruguayan expatriate sportspeople in Argentina
Uruguayan expatriate sportspeople in Paraguay
Uruguayan expatriate sportspeople in Colombia
Uruguayan expatriate sportspeople in Brazil
Independiente Medellín footballers
Independiente Santa Fe footballers
1959 births
Living people
Copa América-winning players
Cerro Largo F.C. managers
Rocha F.C. managers